is a 45,000 seat retractable roof stadium in Toyota, Aichi Prefecture, Japan.

History
It was built in 2001 and is often used as home to the J1 League club Nagoya Grampus. The stadium is football-specific, which gives matches an authentic football aura; however, its location outside Nagoya city makes it impractical for consolidating the club's fan base in its billed hometown.

It is also used by Toyota Verblitz, a rugby union team in the Japan Rugby League One.

Its roof is unique in that it folds much like an accordion; however, the roof has never been closed since 2015 due to extra costs for maintenance. 

Toyota Stadium is one of the venues of the FIFA Club World Cup (formerly the Toyota Cup). The stadium was also used as one of the venues for 2019 Rugby World Cup, the first Rugby World Cup to be held in Asia. In RWC events, the stadium had been referred to as "City of Toyota Stadium" to avoid confusion as if the name of the stadium is a form of naming rights by Toyota Motor Co.,  although it is not.

Football international matches

2019 Rugby World Cup matches

See also
 List of sports venues with the name Toyota

References

External links

 Official Website
 FIFA Profile

Football venues in Japan
Rugby union stadiums in Japan
Retractable-roof stadiums in Japan
Nagoya Grampus
Sports venues in Aichi Prefecture
Venues of the 2026 Asian Games
Asian Games football venues
Sports venues completed in 2001
2001 establishments in Japan
Toyota, Aichi